Gretna railway station was a railway station close to Gretna Green in Scotland although the station was on the English side of the border. However the Border Union Railway built the station adjacent to the Caledonian Railway's Gretna station south on Gretna Junction and in the England/Scotland border in Cumbria.

History 
The station opened on 1 November 1861. It closed on 9 August 1915.

As with the adjacent Caledonian station, very little remains of the station in 2008.

The Border Union Railway station was one of three serving Gretna, the others being:
 Gretna built by Glasgow, Dumfries and Carlisle Railway in 1848 (successor station open)
 Gretna built by the Caledonian Railway in 1847, closing in 1951.

References

Notes

Sources 
 
 
 
 Gretna (Border Union) railway station on navigable OS map

Disused railway stations in Cumbria
Former Border Union Railway stations
Railway stations in Great Britain opened in 1861
Railway stations in Great Britain closed in 1915
1861 establishments in England